Louis Polonia (8 January 1935 – 14 October 2005) was a French footballer. He competed in the men's tournament at the 1960 Summer Olympics.

References

External links
 

1935 births
2005 deaths
French footballers
Olympic footballers of France
Footballers at the 1960 Summer Olympics
Sportspeople from Aveyron
Association football defenders
Footballers from Occitania (administrative region)